Colleen Ang (born 20 September 1969) is a former road cyclist from Singapore. She represented her nation at the 2010 UCI Road World Championships.

References

External links
 

Singaporean female cyclists
Living people
1969 births
Singaporean sportspeople of Chinese descent
Place of birth missing (living people)